This is a list of methods of capital punishment, also known as execution.

Current methods

Ancient methods
Many of the former methods combine execution with torture, often intending to make a spectacle of pain and suffering with overtones of sadism, cruelty, intimidation, and dehumanisation.

See also
 Capital punishment in Judaism

References

External links
Death Penalty Worldwide: Academic research database on the laws, practice, and statistics of capital punishment for every death penalty country in the world.

Crime-related lists
Death-related lists
 
Law-related lists